Ittifaq or Ittifak may refer to:
 Ittifaq al-Muslimin, a political party of Muslims in the Russian Empire
 Ittifaq Party, a nationalist political party in Tatarstan
 İttifaQ, the Tatar hip-hop group